Guerreros Zacapu, is a professional Mexican football club. They currently play in the Group VIII of the Tercera División de México. The team is reborn in May 2015 in the Segunda División de México as Monarcas Zacapu, a filial team of Monarcas Morelia. In 2016 the team was rebranded as Guerreros Zacapu, however, they maintained the original name in the FMF register. In 2019, the team was paused and their register was rented to a new team called Chocos de Tabasco. For 2020, the team returns to Zacapu.

Roster

Team Staff

External links
 Official Site 
The website that was originally here has been taken down.
Football clubs in Michoacán
2005 establishments in Mexico